The 2019 Dynamic Billard St. Johann im Pongau Open was a professional nine-ball pool tournament and the third Euro Tour event of 2019. The event was held from 13 to 16 June 2019, at the Alpina, Wellness & Sporthotel in Sankt Johann im Pongau, Austria. The event followed the Treviso Open, won by Poland's Konrad Juszczyszyn, and preceded the Veldhoven Open.

The St. Johann im Pongau Open final was contested between the top two ranked players, Eklent Kaçi and Joshua Filler. Kaçi won the event, defeating Filler 9–6. Alexander Kazakis was the defending champion, having defeated Denis Grabe in the 2018 Austria Open final (9–5). However, Kazakis lost twice in the double-elimination round and did not reach the knockout round. Jasmin Ouschan was the defending champion of the women's event, after defeating Marharyta Fefilava in the 2018 final (7–2). In a rematch of the previous year's event, Ouschan defended her championship by defeating Fefilava 7–1 in this year's final.

Format
The St. Johann im Pongau Open was played as a double-elimination knockout tournament, until the round of 32. From that point on, the event continued as a single elimination bracket. All matches were played as a -to-nine- under the  format. The event had a total of 196 players competing in the double elimination round. The women's event had 49 participants in a different double-elimination bracket until the round of 16, also continuing as a single elimination tournament form.

The previous years' women's champion Jasmin Ouschan competed in both the men's and women's event.

Prize fund 
The tournament prize fund was similar to that of other Euro Tour events; €4,500 was awarded to the winner of the event.

Summary
The event began on 13 June 2019. Matches were played on 24 tables, across the Alpina Alpendorf & Sporthotel Pre-event, International Billiard Promotion Foundation (IPBF) president David Morris signed a contract with venue owner Theo Riedlecke for the event to be held in the resort for the following three years. Matches were broadcast live via the Euro Tour website, with some matches streamed via Facebook and pool website Kozoom. The event also had guest commentary for matches by players such as Joshua Filler. The defending champion was Alexander Kazakis, after defeating Denis Grabe 9–5 in the previous year's final.

Double-elimination
The double-elimination round began with 196 participants; players were eliminated after losing two matches. On the first day, multiple time champion, Thorsten Hohmann was defeated by Niels Feijen. Feijen took an early 3–1 lead, despite both players making errors. Feijen then extended his advantage to lead 7–2. Both players made a  before Feijen won rack 12 to defeat Hohmann 9–3. Hohmann failed to progress to the knockout round, being eliminated in the third losers' round to Sanjin Pehlivanovic 9–2. Fifth-ranked Mark Gray also lost on the first day to Fabio Petroni. Petroni and Gray remained level at 3–3 before Petroni won six of the next seven racks to progress 9–4. Gray would be defeated again in the third losers' round, 9–4 to Alex Montpellier to be eliminated. Three-time world champion Oliver Ortmann was also defeated by Imran Majid 2–9, before being eliminated in the second losers' round to Mariusz Skoneczny.

Defending champion Kazakis also failed to qualify for the round of 32. He lost his second match to Damianos Giallourakis 9–7. He then defeated Nick Malai on a deciding rack 9–8 in the losers' fourth round. In his decisive play-off match, Kazakis lost to Daniel Maciol 9–6, and he was thus eliminated.

Knockout
The last 32 players competed on a single elimination bracket, with the round-of-32 played on 14 June. The top two ranked players Eklent Kaçi and Joshua Filler both qualified for the round-of-16, with wins over David Alcaide and Christian Froehlich respectively. Third-ranked Mateusz Śniegocki was defeated by 55th ranked Tim De Ruyter 6–9. Wojciech Szewczyk qualified for the round-of-16 after completing a whitewash of Stefan Huber.

The round-of-16 to the final was played on 15 June. Two round-of-16 matches were decided on a final rack: Ralf Souquet defeated Radosław Babica and Kaçi defeated Wojciech Szewczyk, both 9–8. Mario He, who missed the 2019 Leende Open due to a drugs offence, was ranked seventh for the tournament because he had two tournament wins in 2018. He defeated Marc Bijsterbosch in the round-of-16, 9–1. In the quarter-finals, He lost to Giallourakis, who reached his first Euro Tour semi-final. Elsewhere, the two Treviso Open finalists Ivo Aarts and Konrad Juszczyszyn lost to Filler and Kaçi respectively. In the semi-finals, Kaçi defeated Souquet 9–5 and Filler defeated Giallourakis 9–6; both reaching the final.

In the final, the two highest ranked players for the tournament faced each other. Kaçi had finished as the runner up in both the 2018 Veldhoven Open and the 2018 Leende Open, ending up as the highest in the rankings. Filler having won the 2019 Leende Open and was ranked second. The winner of the final would take the first place in the Euro Tour rankings. The final started with racks being won in line with the break, until Kaçi took a 3–2 lead. However, Filler brought the match to 5–5, before Kaçi went ahead again at 7–5. As a result, Kaçi remained the number one Euro Tour player, and Filler retained his second place.

Women's event
The women's event took place on 15 and 16 June 2019, with matches being held as a race-to-seven racks; 49 players participated. The defending champion was Jasmin Ouschan, who won the previous year's event, defeating Marharyta Fefilava in the final 7–2. Kristina Tkach, ranked first in the Euro Tour women's ranking, did not appear at the event. The double-elimination round started on 15 June, with 16 players qualifying for the knockout round. Despite not competing since 2016, Kamila Khodjaeva won all three of her opening matches, including wins over Kinga Rauk, Ewa Bak and Fefilava to reach the knockout round.

After reaching the round of 16, the event continued as a single elimination tournament. Ouschan defeated Ana Gradišnik 7–1, Ina Kaplan 7–1, and Sara Rocha 7–5 to reach the final. Fefilawa also reached the final, defeating Pia Filler 7–3, Monika Margeta 7–5, and Veronika Hubrtova 7–4. The same players faced each other as the 2018 final; Ouschan defeated Fafilawa to win her 14th Euro Tour title. After the victory, Ouschan said: "I feel really comfortable here, although playing in Austria always means a bit more pressure for me ... My success story here in St. Johann is something very special."

Results

Men's event
Below is the results from the round of 32 (Last 32) onward with positions were determined by performance in the double elimination round. Players in bold denote match winners:

Women's event
The following results are from the knockout stages following the round of 16 (Last 16). Players in bold denote match winners:

References

External links

 Official Website

Euro Tour
Sporting events in Austria
Austria Open
Austria Open
Austria Open
International sports competitions hosted by Austria